Cottonwood Creek Archeological Site may refer to:

Cottonwood Creek Archeological Site (Homer, Alaska), listed on the National Register of Historic Places in Kenai Peninsula Borough, Alaska
Cottonwood Creek Archeological Site (Belgrade, Nebraska), listed on the National Register of Historic Places in Nance County, Nebraska